Johar Baru is an administrative village in the Johar Baru district of Indonesia. Its postal code is 10560.

See also
 List of administrative villages of Jakarta

Administrative villages in Jakarta
Central Jakarta